Godzilla is the third solo studio album by American rapper Yukmouth. It was released on July 22, 2003 via Rap-A-Lot 4 Life. Recording sessions took place at Smoke House Studios in North Hollywood, and at Dean's List House of Hits and Noddfactor Studios in Houston. Production was handled by Nan Dogg, Dame Grease, Mike D., Mike Dean, Arch Bishop Storm, C. Notes, G-Casso, Joseph "JoJo" Hearne, Mr. Lee and Mr. Mixx, with J. Prince serving as executive producer. The album peaked at number 112 on the Billboard 200 and number 21 on the Top R&B/Hip-Hop Albums in the United States.

Track listing

Charts

References

External links

2003 albums
Yukmouth albums
Rap-A-Lot Records albums
Albums produced by Mr. Mixx
Albums produced by Dame Grease
Gangsta rap albums by American artists
Albums produced by Mike Dean (record producer)
Godzilla (franchise)